is a Japanese footballer who plays for Honda Lock SC.

Club statistics
Updated to 23 February 2020.

References

External links

Profile at Gainare Tottori

1994 births
Living people
Fukuoka University alumni
Association football people from Fukuoka Prefecture
Japanese footballers
J3 League players
Japan Football League players
Gainare Tottori players
Honda Lock SC players
Association football defenders